Zabaykalsky (masculine), Zabaykalskaya (feminine), or Zabaykalskoye (neuter) is the name of several rural localities in Russia.

Modern localities
Zabaykalsky, Zabaykalsky Krai, a settlement in Chitinsky District of Zabaykalsky Krai
Zabaykalskoye, a selo in Vyazemsky District of Khabarovsk Krai

Historical localities
Zabaykalsky, Republic of Buryatia, former settlement under the administrative jurisdiction of Oktyabrsky City District of the city of republic significance of Ulan-Ude, Republic of Buryatia; merged into Ulan-Ude in February 2010